Percy Noble may refer to:
 Sir Allan Herbert Percy (1908 1982) Knight, Commander RN, MP
 Sir Percy Noble (Royal Navy officer) (1880–1955), Royal Navy officer
 Percy Verner Noble (1902–1996), Canadian Member of Parliament